Shankarnagar is a town in Umaria district of Madhya Pradesh.

Cities and towns in Umaria district